The 1912 United States presidential election in Oklahoma took place on November 5, 1912, as part of the 1912 United States presidential election. Voters chose ten representatives, or electors, to the Electoral College, who voted for president and vice president.

Oklahoma was won by the Democratic nominees, governor of New Jersey Woodrow Wilson and governor of Indiana Thomas R. Marshall, with 46.95 percent of the popular vote, against the Republican ticket of incumbent president William Howard Taft (R–Ohio), running with Columbia University President Nicholas Murray Butler, with 35.77 percent of the popular vote, and the five-time candidate of the Socialist Party of America for President of the United States Eugene V. Debs (S–Indiana), running with the first Socialist mayor of a major city in the United States Emil Seidel, with 16.42 percent of the popular vote.

Oklahoma was the second best state in percentage points for Socialist candidate Eugene V. Debs with 16.42 percent with Nevada being his best with 16.47 percent. This was also the only state in which the Progressive Party candidates, former president Theodore Roosevelt and his running mate, governor of California Hiram Johnson, were not on the ballot.

Results

Results by county

See also
 United States presidential elections in Oklahoma

Notes

References

Oklahoma
1912
1912 Oklahoma elections